The 2018 Nashville SC season will be the club's inaugural season both as an organization and as a member in the United Soccer League (USL). Nashville SC plays in the Eastern Conference of the USL.

Club

Technical Staff 
{|class="wikitable"
|-
! style="background:#264892; color:white; border:3px solid #FAC825;" scope="col" colspan="2"|Technical Staff
|-
!Position
!Staff
|-

|-

|-

|-

Roster

Competitions

Friendlies 

Source:

USL

Standings

Results summary

Results Table

Postseason

U.S. Open Cup

Goalscorers
Includes all competitive matches.

References 

2018 USL season
American soccer clubs 2018 season
Nashville SC
2018